Usage data is the most effective way of evaluating the true relevancy and value of a website. For example, if users arrive on a web site and go back immediately (high bounce rate), chances are that it wasn’t relevant to their query in the first place. However, if a user repeatedly visits a web site and spends a long time on the site, there is a high likelihood that it is extremely relevant. When it comes to search engines, relevant valuable sites get promoted while irrelevant sites get demoted.

Search engines want their results to be highly relevant to web users to make sure that web users keep returning to the search engine for future searches. And the best way to establish relevance to users is to know how they use web sites. Cookies are used by search engines to maintain a history of a user’s search activity.

References 

Web analytics